The Feathers Hotel may refer to:

 Feathers Hotel, Ludlow, Shropshire
The Feathers Hotel, Ledbury, Herefordshire
Seven Feathers Casino Resort, Canyonville, Oregon